Lucky Old Sun is the twelfth studio album by American country music artist Kenny Chesney. It was released on October 14, 2008 as the first release for Blue Chair Records, Chesney's personal division of the BNA Records record label. The album produced two singles in "Everybody Wants to Go to Heaven" and "Down the Road", which were both number ones on the country charts. Chesney's versions of those two songs are duets with The Wailers and Mac McAnally respectively. This was Kenny's first album since 1997's I Will Stand to not have a Top 40 hit on the Billboard Hot 100 chart.

Content
The lead-off single, "Everybody Wants to Go to Heaven", was released on August 11, 2008. In October, this song became a Number One hit on the Billboard country charts. The next single, "Down the Road", is a duet with Mac McAnally. MacAnally had previously released this a single for himself from his 1990 album Simple Life. This rendition has also reached Number One.

Two of this album's songs were previously recorded by Willie Nelson: "Ten with a Two" was previously a single in 1990 from his album Born for Trouble and "I'm Alive" was recorded on his album Moment of Forever. "That Lucky Old Sun", recorded as a duet with Nelson, is a cover of the 1949 pop standard made famous by Frankie Laine. Chesney's version of "I'm Alive", a duet with Dave Matthews, also appears on his 2009 compilation album Greatest Hits II, from which it was released as its second single in August 2009.

Commercial performance
Lucky Old Sun debuted at number one on the US Billboard 200 selling 176,000 copies in its first week. It was also his fifth consecutive album to top the US Top Country Albums chart. As of July 2009, the album sold 720,000 copies in United States. On February 13, 2017, the album was certified platinum by the Recording Industry Association of America (RIAA) for sales of a million copies in the United States.

Track listing

Personnel
As listed in liner notes

 Wyatt Beard – background vocals
 Pat Buchanan – electric guitar
 Buddy Cannon – background vocals
 Kenny Chesney – acoustic guitar, lead vocals
 Eric Darken – percussion
 Scott Ducaj – trumpet
 Chris Dunn – trombone
 Kenny Greenberg – electric guitar
 Robert Greenidge – steel drums
 Tim Hensley – background vocals
 Steve Herrman – trumpet
 Steve Hinson – steel guitar
 John Hobbs – piano, synthesizer, Wurlitzer
 Jim Horn – tenor saxophone
 Paul Leim – drums
 B. James Lowry – acoustic guitar
 Mac McAnally – acoustic guitar and duet vocals on "Down the Road"
 Randy McCormick – B3 organ, synthesizer
 Dave Matthews – vocals on "I'm Alive"
 Willie Nelson – vocals on "That Lucky Old Sun (Just Rolls Around Heaven All Day)"
 Larry Paxton – bass guitar, gut string guitar
 Mickey Raphael – harmonica
 Gary Prim – piano, synthesizer, Wurlitzer
 The Wailers – vocals on "Everybody Wants to Go to Heaven"
 John Willis – acoustic guitar, electric guitar, gut string guitar
 Lonnie Wilson – drums

Charts

Weekly charts

Year-end charts

Singles

Certifications

References

2008 albums
Kenny Chesney albums
BNA Records albums
Albums produced by Buddy Cannon